Ellis Ferreira and Rick Leach were the defending champions but did not compete that year.

Marius Barnard and Jim Thomas won in the final 7–6(12–10), 6–4 against David Adams and Martín García.

Seeds
Champion seeds are indicated in bold text while text in italics indicates the round in which those seeds were eliminated.

  David Adams /  Martín García (final)
  Simon Aspelin /  Robbie Koenig (quarterfinals)
  Chris Haggard /  Tom Vanhoudt (first round)
  Lucas Arnold /  Johan Landsberg (first round)

Draw

References

External links
 ITF – tournament edition details
 Doubles draw

2001 Heineken Open
Doubles